The 2019 Junior World Fencing Championships from 6 to 14 April at 2019 in Toruń, Poland.

Medal summary

Junior events

Men's events

Women's events

Cadet events

Men's events

Women's events

Medal table

References
 Full Results

External links
 Official website

Junior World Fencing Championships
2019 in fencing
Fencing
2019 in Polish sport
International fencing competitions hosted by Poland
Sport in Toruń
Fencing